The Gamits is an American pop punk band who formed in 1996. The band was disbanded in 2005 due to the members wishing to participate in and start other projects, but regrouped in late 2009. The current line-up is Chris Fogal on guitar and vocals, Forrest Bartosh on drums and Johnny Wilson on bass and background vocals.

Discography

Studio albums
1996: Come Get Some (Drug Store Records)
1998: This Is My Boomstick (To The Left Records)
2000: Endorsed By You (Suburban Home Records)
2001: A Small Price To Pay (Suburban Home Records)
2004: Antidote (Suburban Home Records)
2010: Parts (Paper + Plastick)

Compilations
2002: Rose Harbor Anthems - Italian-only compilation (Wynona Records)
2003: Leaps and Bounds - Japanese-only compilation (CR Japan)
2006: Golden Sometimes - 4 disk box set (Suburban Home Records)

Sources

References

American pop punk groups
Punk rock groups from Colorado
Musical groups established in 1996
Musical groups from Denver
1996 establishments in Colorado